Enos Warren Persons (October 27, 1836 – February 13, 1899) was an American businessman and politician.

Biography 
Persons was born in Sheldon, New York and attended  the Aurora Academy. In 1859, he moved to the town of Albany, Green County, Wisconsin. He then moved to Glenmore, Wisconsin and finally, in 1873, Persons moved to De Pere, Wisconsin. Persons was a grain dealer and owner of a general store. He served on the school board and on the Brown County Board of Supervisors.

In 1885 and 1886, he served in the Wisconsin State Assembly and was a Democrat. Between 1889 and 1893, Persons served in the Wisconsin State Senate. He died in Phoenix, Arizona Territory.

Notes

External links

1836 births
1899 deaths
People from Sheldon, New York
People from De Pere, Wisconsin
Businesspeople from Wisconsin
County supervisors in Wisconsin
School board members in Wisconsin
Democratic Party Wisconsin state senators
People from Green County, Wisconsin
19th-century American politicians
19th-century American businesspeople
Democratic Party members of the Wisconsin State Assembly